The 2017 Santaizi ATP Challenger will be a professional tennis tournament played on indoor carpet courts. It will be the fourth edition of the tournament which will be part of the 2017 ATP Challenger Tour. It will take place in Taipei, Taiwan between 17 and 23 April.

Point distribution

Singles main draw entrants

Seeds

 1 Rankings are as of April 10, 2017.

Other entrants
The following players received wildcards into the singles main draw:
  Marcos Baghdatis
  Lee Kuan-yi
  Jimmy Wang
  Yang Tsung-hua

The following players received entry from the qualifying draw:
  Matthias Bachinger
  Matthew Ebden
  Sasikumar Mukund
  Ruan Roelofse

Champions

Singles

 Lu Yen-hsun def.  Tatsuma Ito 6–1, 7–6(7–4).

Doubles

 Marco Chiudinelli /  Franko Škugor def.  Sanchai Ratiwatana /  Sonchat Ratiwatana 4–6, 6–2, [10–5].

References

Santaizi ATP Challenger
Santaizi ATP Challenger
2017 in Taiwanese tennis